Richard Perceval Graves (born 21 December 1945) is an English biographer, poet and lecturer, best known for his three-volume biography of his uncle Robert Graves.

Biography
Richard Graves was born in Brighton, England, the son of John Tiarks Ranke Graves, a younger son of Alfred Perceval Graves.  He was educated at Tollard Royal, Dorset, The White House, Wokingham and at Holme Grange School, Wokingham. He went on to Copthorne School (1954–1959), Charterhouse (1959–1964) and St John's College, Oxford (1964–1968). At Oxford, Graves read Modern History and then completed a Diploma in Education. He then taught at several different schools until 1973, the year in which he became a full-time writer.

Graves is the author of some nineteen books, including biographies of T. E. Lawrence, A. E. Housman, the Powys brothers (John Cowper Powys, Theodore Francis Powys and Llewelyn Powys) and Richard Hughes.  He has written a number of other books on a variety of subjects, and collaborated on several other publishing projects.

Graves continues to write, and lectures on the subjects and people about whom he has written. He is married with three children and lives in Shrewsbury, Shropshire.

Works

References

1945 births
Alumni of St John's College, Oxford
English biographers
English male journalists
Living people
People educated at Charterhouse School
People from Brighton
Male biographers